The 2017 Esiliiga B was the 5th season of the Esiliiga B, third-highest Estonian league for association football clubs, since its establishment in 2013. The season began on 1 March 2017.

Teams
Of the 10 participating teams 5 remain following the 2016 Esiliiga B. The 2016 champions Kuressaare and runners-up Elva were promoted to Esiliiga, while 9th place Flora U19 and 10th place Tulevik II were relegated.  For this season those five teams will be replaced by the Esiliiga relegated Vändra Vaprus, Kohtla-Järve JK Järve and Nõmme Kalju U21 and II Liiga promoted Keila and Paide Linnameeskond U21. The 3rd placed Welco managed to earn a promotion, winning the promotion play-off, while 8th placed Viimsi remained in the league by winning the relegation play-off.

Stadia

Personnel and kits

Managerial changes

Results

League table

Results tables

First half of the season

Second half of the season

Season statistics

Top scorers

Attendance

Awards

Monthly awards

Esiliiga B Player of the Year
Karl Anton Sõerde was named Esiliiga B Player of the Year.

See also
 2016–17 Estonian Cup
 2017–18 Estonian Cup
 2017 Meistriliiga
 2017 Esiliiga

References

External links
Official website

Esiliiga B seasons
3
Estonia